The Ouche is a river in the Côte-d'Or department in eastern France. It is a right tributary of the Saône, which it joins in Échenon. Its source is in Lusigny-sur-Ouche. The Ouche flows through the towns of Bligny-sur-Ouche, La Bussière-sur-Ouche, Fleurey-sur-Ouche, Velars-sur-Ouche, Dijon, Longvic and Varanges. Part of the Canal de Bourgogne runs through the Ouche valley.

References

Rivers of France
Rivers of Bourgogne-Franche-Comté
Rivers of Côte-d'Or